Marama Corlett is a Maltese actress and dancer, best known for her roles as Aki in Blood Drive, Ruby in Sick of It and Corporal Angua in The Watch.

Early life and family

Corlett was born and raised in Malta as one of four sisters. While having a Manx surname, Marama is actually of Maltese, Sicilian and New Zealand heritage. Her father is from New Zealand, and her mother from Malta. She lives in London.

Career
Corlett started her dance career with the Ballet Russ de Malt in Malta, before moving to England to further pursue her ballet career.

Her first professional acting role was in the 2010 film The Devil's Double, directed by New Zealand director Lee Tamahori. She played Lois Fisher in the 2011 West End production of The Children's Hour, directed by Ian Rickson.

In 2011, Sky1 announced that Corlett would play Rina in the television drama Sinbad; she had to learn boxing to prepare for her role. Corlett appeared in Desert Dancer (2013) alongside Freida Pinto, and Maleficent (2014) with Angelina Jolie.

She can be also seen in the music videos for "How" (2016) by Daughter, "The Invisibles" (2018) by Suede, and "You're My Waterloo" (2015) by The Libertines.

Filmography

References

External links
 
 MaramaCorlett on Twitter

British television actresses
Living people
Maltese television actresses
Maltese dancers